The women's 78 kilograms (Half heavyweight) competition at the 2018 Asian Games in Jakarta was held on 31 August at the Jakarta Convention Center Assembly Hall.

Ruika Sato of Japan won the gold medal.

Schedule
All times are Western Indonesia Time (UTC+07:00)

Results

Main bracket

Repechage

References

External links
 
 Official website
 Official website

W78
Judo at the Asian Games Women's Half Heavyweight
Asian W78